The 2019–20 Cal State Bakersfield Roadrunners men's basketball team represented California State University, Bakersfield in the 2019–20 NCAA Division I men's basketball season. The Roadrunners were led by ninth-year head coach Rod Barnes and played their home games at the Icardo Center as member of the Western Athletic Conference. They finished the season 12–19, 6–10 in WAC play to finish in seventh place. They were set to be the No. 7 seed in the WAC tournament, however, the tournament was cancelled amid the COVID-19 pandemic.

The season marked the final year in the WAC for the Roadrunners, as they will join the Big West Conference on July 1, 2020.

Before the season
The Roadrunners finished the 2018–19 season 18–16 overall, and 7–9 in WAC play to finish in a tie for fifth place. They lost in the quarterfinals of the WAC tournament to Texas–Rio Grande Valley. They were invited to the CollegeInsider.com Tournament where they defeated Cal State Fullerton in the first round to win the Riley Wallace Classic and defeated Southern Utah in the second round. In the quarterfinals of the CIT, they lost to Green Bay.

Roster

Schedule

|-
!colspan=12 style=| Exhibition

|-
!colspan=9 style=| Non-Conference Regular Season

|-
!colspan=9 style=| WAC Regular Season

|-
!colspan=9 style=|WAC tournament
|- style="background:#bbbbbb"
| style="text-align:center"|Mar 12, 20206:00 pm, ESPN+
| style="text-align:center"| (7)
| vs. (2) Texas–Rio Grande ValleyQuarterfinals
| colspan=5 rowspan=1 style="text-align:center"|Cancelled due to the COVID-19 pandemic
| style="text-align:center"|Orleans ArenaParadise, NV
|-

Schedule Source:

References

Cal State Bakersfield Roadrunners men's basketball seasons
Cal State Bakersfield
Cal State Bakersfield men's
Cal State Bakersfield men's